Altay Xuedu Airport  is an airport serving Altay City, Ili Kazakh Autonomous Prefecture, Xinjiang, China.

It has one runway designated 11/29 which measures .

Airlines and destinations

See also
 List of airports in China

References

Airports in Xinjiang
Ili Kazakh Autonomous Prefecture